Blue Moon, published by Kosmos and Fantasy Flight Games in 2004, is a living card game (LCG) designed by Reiner Knizia.

Genre
Blue Moon is a fantasy two-player card game made up of 344 cards. Apart from a few promotional cards, all cards are sold in decks of fixed composition so that there are no "rare" cards, and there is no luck involved in acquiring them.

Gameplay
The gameplay of Blue Moon simulates the struggles of various characters who live in the fictional "Blue Moon" world. Each character has their own unique traits and gameplay mechanics. This is represented by a 30-card deck (plus a "leader" card).

The base Blue Moon game box contains a small game board and three small plastic dragons which are used for scoring counters during the game. The base box also contains two complete decks for the Vulca and Hoax characters. Blue Moon cards are large (120mm × 70mm) and resemble tarot cards. All decks of cards come in adequately-sized cartons.

The following additional characters are available to be bought separately:
 Mimix
 Flit
 Khind
 Terrah
 Pillar
 Aqua
 Buka (Buka Invasion)

In addition, there are two more decks titled Emissaries & Inquisitors: Allies and Emissaries & Inquisitors: Blessings. These decks contain additional cards which can be used in at least two ways. Advanced rules in the basic set allow players to have more freedom in constructing their own decks. Each deck is based on a single character with imported cards from other characters limited by the deck construction costs of the cards (measured in "moons"). The Emissaries & Inquisitors decks allow additional deck-building possibilities.

Many Blue Moon cards carry text to specify its influence on the game (occasionally overriding the game rules) and is therefore very language-dependent. Known available editions exist in English (Fantasy Flight Games), German (Kosmos), Dutch (999 Games, excluding the Buka Invasion), French (Tilsit, incomplete), and Japanese (Hobby Japan). Some promotional cards have been released and given as gifts at various gaming events.

Publication history
In 2006, Fantasy Flight Games published a Blue Moon-related board game called Blue Moon City. While it is not compatible with Blue Moon card game and is a complete German-style board game for 2 to 4 players, it is set in the same "Blue Moon" world. It also shares artwork with the Blue Moon card games, but apart from some fairly tenuous thematic links, it is a different game.

During the 2007 edition of the Lucca Comics & Games Italian comics and games convention, Reiner Knizia himself confirmed that no new decks for Blue Moon were under development, as the publisher was no longer interested in publishing them.

Illustrators
 John Matson  Vulca
 Franz Vohwinkel  Hoax and Mutants (also dragon designer)
 Todd Lockwood  Mimix
 Jim Nelson  Flit
 Scott M. Fischer  Khind
 Daren Bader  Terrah
 Michael Phillippi  Pillar
 Randy Gallegos  Hyla
 Lars Grant-West  Aqua
 Jeremy Jarvis  Interference Cards

Reviews
Pyramid

References

External links
 Official Blue Moon page (Fantasy Flight Edition)
 
 Kosmos-supported Blue Moon Fans website (English language forum)
 "(Almost) official" English language FAQ list and Simple Tournament Rules

Card games introduced in 2004
Dedicated deck card games
Reiner Knizia games
Kosmos (publisher) games
Fantasy Flight Games games